Lycoming Creek is a  tributary of the West Branch Susquehanna River located in Tioga and Lycoming counties in Pennsylvania in the United States.

Geography
Smaller streams feeding Lycoming Creek include Pleasant Stream, Grays Run, Roaring Branch, Hoagland Run, and Trout Run.

Watershed
Approximately 81.5% of the Lycoming Creek watershed is in Lycoming County, with 16.5% in Tioga County, and 1.5% in Sullivan County. Of that area,  are forested,  are given to agricultural uses, only  are developed, and the remaining  is classified as barren.

Recreation
Lycoming Creek is a popular site for trout fishing and is usually heavily stocked with fish in the spring, especially in its upper reaches in Lycoming County. Much of the creek runs through heavily wooded areas, including the Tiadaghton State Forest near Grays Run. North of Trout Run, Pennsylvania Route 14 runs parallel to the creek. From Trout Run south to Williamsport, U.S. Route 15 (and old route 15) run parallel to the creek. Historic Bowman Field, home to the minor league baseball Williamsport Crosscutters, is located along the creek near its mouth in the western Newberry section of Williamsport.

History
Lycoming Creek, which begins in McNett Township, served as a highway of sorts during the colonial era of Pennsylvania's history.   The local Lenape (Delaware) people called it Legani-hanne, meaning "sandy stream" - the name was later rendered by Europeans as Lycaumick and then Lycoming.  The stream was used by early explorers and the Native Americans in the area as a means of travel. They were able to float their canoes down the creek and into the West Branch Susquehanna River. This mode of transportation was considerably faster than walking the path.

Conrad Weiser guided Moravian missionaries along the creek and path to reach Onondaga, the capital of the Iroquois Confederacy in 1737. Raiding parties of Indian warriors used the creek and path in 1770 when conducting attacks on the West Branch Susquehanna Valley strongholds of Fort Muncy and Fort Freeland. Fort Freeland was also attacked and captured by Loyalists in July 1779. Colonel Thomas Hartley led the 6th Pennsylvania Regiment up the Sheshequin Path during the American Revolution. Hartley's expedition in 1778 preceded the Sullivan Expedition of 1779. Both Hartley and Sullivan were instrumental in claiming the frontier of Pennsylvania and New York for the forces of the Continental Army. As Hartley and his men passed through Lewis Township the Sheshequin path was widened. The widening of the path helped to open this area to settlement in the years following the Revolution.

In 1839, the Williamsport and Elmira Railroad was built along the creek from Williamsport to Ralston, and was extended to the source of the creek and beyond to Elmira, New York, in 1854. The railroad was reorganized in 1860 as the Elmira and Williamsport Railroad, and came under the control of the Northern Central Railway in 1863, and later the Pennsylvania Railroad. U.S. Route 15 and Pennsylvania Route 14 were later built up the length of the creek. In 1972, flooding caused by Hurricane Agnes washed out several rail bridges and resulted in the abandonment of the railroad north of Hepburnville; the remainder was abandoned in 1986.

There was severe flooding on Lycoming Creek on January 19 and 20, 1996, when a combination of heavy snow on the ground, heavy rains and subsequent melting, and ice dams led to flooding two feet higher than that seen in 1972 with Hurricane Agnes. Six people died as a result of flooding on Lycoming Creek in the greater Williamsport area, and there was millions of dollars of damage to property.

See also
List of rivers of Pennsylvania

External links

General reference

Pennsylvania Department of Environmental Protection 2001 Pennsylvania Gazetteer of Streams
Lycoming County Watersheds Map
Official Lycoming County Map showing all townships, villages, boroughs, cities, county roads, rivers, creeks, and some streams

Lycoming Creek
Pennsylvania Game and Fish Commission description of Lycoming Creek
Chesapeake Bay Program page on Lycoming Creek Watershed
USGS Real Time Water Data for Lycoming Creek:
Gauge near the creek's mouth at Williamsport
Gauge upstream near Trout Run
Lycoming County Stream Gauge Data for Lycoming Creek:
Gauge at Hepburnville
Gauge at Bodines
Gauge at Ralston
Gauge at Deer Crossing
Gauge at Roaring Branch
Information on the 1996 floods from the USGS

Rivers of Lycoming County, Pennsylvania
Rivers of Pennsylvania
Rivers of Tioga County, Pennsylvania
Tributaries of the West Branch Susquehanna River